The Committee for National Revolution was a Turkic Nationalist Uighur party which existed in 1932–1934. It helped found the First East Turkestan Republic. It was anti-Chinese, anti-Chinese Muslim, anti-Communist and anti-Christian. The leader of Karakash gold miners Ismail Khan Khoja, the Khotan Emir Muhammad Amin Bughra, his brothers Abdullah Bughra, Nur Ahmad Jan Bughra, and Sabit Damulla Abdulbaki joined the committee. It had originally 300 members and 50 rifles. On February 20, 1933, it set up a provisional Khotan government with Sabit as prime minister and Muhammad Amin Bughra as head of the armed forces. It favored the establishment of an Islamic theocracy.

See also
 First East Turkestan Republic
 Second East Turkestan Republic
 Young Kashgar Party

References

1932 establishments in China
1934 disestablishments in China
Anti-communist parties
Defunct political parties in China
East Turkestan independence movement
20th century in Xinjiang
Islamic political parties
Islamist groups
Nationalist movements in Asia
Pan-Turkist organizations
Political parties disestablished in 1934
Political parties established in 1932
Political parties in the Republic of China
Rebel groups in China